Christopher Thomas Prior (born December 1990) is an English actor, known for his lead role as Sergey in the British-Estonian historical romantic drama Firebird. He has also appeared in supporting roles in Kingsman: The Secret Service and in The Theory of Everything as Stephen Hawking's son Robert.

Early life

Prior was educated at The Thomas Hardye School in Dorchester. In 2002 he appeared in "Fire from Heaven", produced by the Dorchester Community Plays Association. He studied Performing Arts at Weymouth College, graduating with distinction, before attending the Royal Academy of Dramatic Art (RADA). He graduated from RADA in 2012.

Career

Prior's West End debut was in 2013 in a trio of plays produced by the National Youth Theatre: Tory Boyz by James Graham; Romeo and Juliet; and Prince of Denmark, a Hamlet prequel by Michael Lesslie.

Prior wrote his first short film Breaking the Circle in 2014.

In 2021, Prior starred in Firebird as Sergey Serebrennikov. He co-wrote and produced the film with director Peeter Rebane. The film is about the real-life romance between a conscript, Sergey Fetisov, and a fighter pilot in Soviet era Estonia.  Rebane began working on a screenplay based on a memoir by Fetisov.  After learning about the script, Prior met with Rebane in London.

Filmography

Film

Television

Awards and nominations

Personal life 
Prior identifies as a member of the LGBTQ+ community.

References

External links

 

21st-century British male actors
21st-century English male actors
1990 births
Alumni of RADA
English male film actors
Living people

English LGBT people